Kočno is a small remote settlement in the hills west of Leskovec pri Krškem in the Municipality of Krško in eastern Slovenia. The area is part of the traditional region of Lower Carniola. It is now included with the rest of the municipality in the Lower Sava Statistical Region.

References

External links
Kočno on Geopedia

Populated places in the Municipality of Krško